Terephtyl is a long-acting synthetic sulfonamide antibiotic used for the treatment of infection caused by susceptible strains.

References

Sulfonamide antibiotics
Pyrimidines
Imines